Neosisyphus tarantula, is a species of dung beetle found in Sri Lanka.

Description
This oval, very convex species has an average length of about 11 mm. Body black and shiny. Head and pronotum feebly coppery. Dorsum covered with dark hooked setae. It has very long posterior legs. Head strongly and fairly closely punctured. Clypeus possess two small acute teeth at the front margin. Pronotum finely and very sparsely punctured. Elytra bear shallow punctured striae. Pygidium shiny and strongly but sparsely punctured.

References 

Scarabaeinae
Insects of Sri Lanka
Insects described in 1909